Mihr Hormozd was an Iranian nobleman from the House of Suren. He was the son of Mardanshah, the padgospan of Nemroz, who was later executed by the orders of the Sasanian king Khosrau II (r. 590–628). In 628, Khosrau was overthrown by his son Kavadh II (r. 628), and was taken to prison, where he was shortly executed by Mihr Hormozd who sought to avenge his father's death. However, after the execution, Kavadh had Mihr Hormizd killed.

Sources 

 

Year of birth unknown
628 deaths
7th-century Iranian people
House of Suren
People executed by the Sasanian Empire
Shahnameh characters